Statistics of First League of FR Yugoslavia for the 1993–94 season.

Overview 
The league was divided into 2 groups, A and B, consisting each of 10 clubs. Both groups were played in league system. By winter break all clubs in each group meet each other twice, home and away, with the bottom four classified from A group moving to the group B, and being replaced by the top four from the B group. At the end of the season the same situation happened with four teams being replaced from A and B groups, adding the fact that the bottom three clubs from the B group were relegated into the Second League of FR Yugoslavia for the next season and replaced by the top three from that league.

At the end of the season FK Partizan became champions, with their striker Savo Milošević the league's top-scorer with 21 goals.

The relegated clubs were OFK Kikinda, FK Mogren and FK Jastrebac Niš.

Teams

Autumn

IA league

Table 

Bonus point
 13: Partizan (7 for 1st place, 6 for obtaining 27-29 points)
 11: Red Star (6 for 2nd place, 5 for obtaining 24-26 points)
 10: Vojvodina (5 for 3rd place, 5 for obtaining 24-26 points)
 8: Zemun (5 for 4th place, 3 for obtaining 18-20 points)
 7: Proleter (4 for 5th place, 3 for obtaining 18-20 points)
 7: Budućnost (4 for 6th place, 3 for obtaining 18-20 points)

Results

IB league

Table 

Bonus point
 7: OFK Beograd (3 for 1st place, 4 for obtaining 21-23 points)
 6: Spartak Subotica (2 for 2nd place, 4 for obtaining 21-23 points)
 4: Radnički Jugopetrol (1 for 3rd place, 3 for obtaining 18-20 points)
 4: FK Bečej (1 for 4th place, 3 for obtaining 18-20 points)

Results

Spring

IA league

Table

Results

IB league

Table

Results

Final table

Winning squad

Top goalscorers

External links 
 Table and results at RSSSF

Yugoslav First League seasons
Yugo
1993–94 in Yugoslav football